Two referendums were held in Switzerland on 16 October 1966. Voters were asked whether they approved of an amendment to the constitution on Swiss citizens living abroad and a popular initiative "for the fight against alcoholism". The constitutional amendment was approved whilst the popular initiative was rejected.

Results

Constitutional amendment

Popular initiative on alcoholism

References

1966 referendums
1966 in Switzerland
Referendums in Switzerland